Paratomoxia is a subgenus of beetles in the family Mordellidae, containing the following species:

Paratomoxia agathae Batten, 1990
Paratomoxia auroscutellata Ermisch, 1950
Paratomoxia biplagiata (Ermisch, 1949)
Paratomoxia hieroglyphica Ermisch, 1952
Paratomoxia maynei (Pic, 1931)
Paratomoxia pulchella (Ermisch, 1949)
Paratomoxia straeleni Ermisch, 1950
Paratomoxia testaceiventris (Pic, 1931)

References

Mordellidae
Insect subgenera